Michael James Pappas (born December 29, 1960) is an American politician and former one term Republican Congressman from New Jersey, serving from 1997 to 1999. He is currently the Township Administrator in Bridgewater, New Jersey. He was an unsuccessful candidate for State Senator in New Jersey's 16th legislative district in the 2021 election. In November 2022, Pappas announced he was running for the State Senate again.

Early life and education

Pappas, a Greek American, was born in 1960 in New Brunswick, New Jersey. He is a graduate of Alma Preparatory School in Zarephath, New Jersey, and attended Seton Hall University.

Political career
He got into politics in the early 1980s, becoming a member of the Franklin Township township council where he served from 1982 to 1987, including two years as mayor. He later would be elected to the Board of Chosen Freeholders for Somerset County, and served from 1984 to 1996, alongside future Governor Christine Todd Whitman, who was also a Freeholder during portions of that time.

Congress

In 1996, Pappas ran for the House of Representatives in New Jersey's 12th congressional district. The incumbent, Republican Dick Zimmer, gave up his seat to run for the U.S. Senate that year. Pappas won the Republican primary, defeating State Senator John O. Bennett and Assemblyman (and future 7th district Representative) Leonard Lance. He then won the general election against Lambertville Mayor David DelVecchio.

Unlike most New Jersey Republicans, Pappas was a staunch conservative. His congressional service included pushing for a stronger national defense, the elimination of the capital gains tax, advocacy for small business, securing the release of the battleship USS New Jersey to the state of New Jersey as a museum, and resurrecting the controversial "Star Wars" national missile defense.

He was a strong supporter of the impeachment of Bill Clinton, and his infamous singing of "Twinkle, Twinkle, Kenneth Starr" on the House floor contributed to his defeat by Rush Holt in 1998.

In 2000, Pappas unsuccessfully sought the Republican nomination for his old congressional seat, losing a highly contentious primary to the more moderate Zimmer by 62 to 38% margin. Holt narrowly defeated Zimmer in the general election to retain his seat.

Later career
During the George W. Bush Administration, Pappas worked for the Small Business Administration in Washington, D.C. He moved back to New Jersey in 2009 after Bush's presidency ended.

In June 2016, Pappas was hired as the Borough Administrator of High Bridge, New Jersey. In December 2019, Pappas was named by Bridgewater Mayor-elect Matt Moench to be the municipality's next Township Administrator.

State Senate campaign
In 2021, Pappas announced that he would be running for the Republican nomination for State Senate in New Jersey's 16th legislative district. The incumbent, Christopher "Kip" Bateman, a moderate Republican who barely won re-election in 2017, decided to retire. The 16th district had previously been a safe Republican district, but after re-districting in 2011, it became a swing district after the removal of Bridgewater and the addition of Princeton. Both of its Assembly seats flipped from red to blue during the 2010s decade. In the early stages of the race, he again competed against Zimmer, who, like Pappas, was also making his first run for political office in over a decade. After Pappas won the organization line for Somerset County, a large part of the 16th district, Zimmer dropped out of the race. Pappas won the Republican primary in June 2021. He lost the general election to Democrat Andrew Zwicker, the district's state assemblyman in November 2021.

Electoral history

References

External links

1960 births
Living people
American people of Greek descent
County commissioners in New Jersey
Mayors of places in New Jersey
People from Franklin Township, Somerset County, New Jersey
Politicians from New Brunswick, New Jersey
Republican Party members of the United States House of Representatives from New Jersey
Small Business Administration personnel